The Murray River is a minor river on Stewart Island / Rakiura of New Zealand.  It enters the Foveaux Strait sea on the eastern side of the island.

References

Rivers of Stewart Island
Foveaux Strait